The South African Rugby Union (SARU) is the governing body for rugby union in South Africa and is affiliated to World Rugby. It was established in 1992 as the South African Rugby Football Union, from the merger of the South African Rugby Board and the non-racial South African Rugby Union (SACOS), and took up its current name in 2005.

SARU organises several national teams, most notably the senior national side, the Springboks.

History

The South African Rugby Board was the rugby union governing body of white South Africans between 1889 and 1992. The governing of white and coloured rugby union was handled separately during South Africa under Apartheid.

On 23 March 1992 the non-racial South African Rugby Union and the South African Rugby Board were merged to form the South African Rugby Football Union. The unified body changed its name in 2005 to the current South African Rugby Union.

The debacle of the 2003 World Cup saw the Springboks exit in the quarterfinals. Further, SARU experienced the scandal of Kamp Staaldraad, the training camp run by then-Boks coach Rudolf Straeuli. Straeuli resigned, as did Rian Oberholzer, the managing director of South Africa Rugby (Pty) Ltd, the commercial arm of SARFU. Soon afterwards, SARFU president Silas Nkununu, facing a strong reelection challenge, withdrew from consideration for election.

Brian van Rooyen was elected president of SARU in 2004. He soon became a highly polarising figure in South African sport, with detractors accusing him of financial shenanigans, favouritism, and general mismanagement. His management style was also widely perceived as autocratic.

One of the major gripes against the Van Rooyen administration was the allocation of venues for the Springboks home test matches. The KwaZulu-Natal Union and the Free State Union did not receive a Tri Nations Test in either 2005 or 2006. Both unions, vocal opponents of Van Rooyen, accused him of punishing them for their opposition.

SANZAR 
However, the biggest bone of contention surrounded the expansion of the Super Rugby competition. SANZAR, a consortium of the South African, Australian, and New Zealand governing bodies, expanded their Super 12 competition to 14 teams, a change that took effect in 2006. South Africa was entitled to add one franchise to the four from the Super 12 era. In a controversial move, the Southern Spears franchise was assured a place in the 2007 and 2008 competitions, with an increasingly unpopular promotion/relegation system established to keep the total of South African Super 14 teams at its allotted five. Van Rooyen was widely viewed as being responsible for this arrangement, which was generally opposed by the existing Super 12/14 sides.

The South African government attempted to step in to address perceived problems within Van Rooyen's administration, but he survived two years of attempts to oust him. Finally, at the 2006 SARU General Meeting, Van Rooyen was voted out in favour of Oregan Hoskins, who immediately promised a more decentralised management style. Shortly after the election, it was alleged that Van Rooyen had offered a bribe of ZAR 3 million (US$485,000) plus a Springboks test against France to the Free State union in exchange for the union changing its vote in the presidential election in his favour. Hoskins soon announced that a planned investigation into Van Rooyen's administration would go forward. 

As for the Spears issue, the SARU Presidents' Council issued a recommendation on 24 March 2006 that SA Rugby revisit the decision to admit the Spears. On 19 April 2006, the decision to admit the Spears was officially overturned by SARU.

See also 
 South African Rugby Union (SACOS)
 South African African Rugby Board
 South African Rugby Football Federation
 South African Rugby Board
 South Africa national rugby union team
 South Africa national rugby sevens team
 South Africa women's national rugby union team
 South Africa women's national rugby sevens team
 Currie Cup
 Super Rugby

References

"Van Rooyen bows to Oregan Hoskins", RugbyRugby.com, 24 February 2006
"How Van Rooyen was eliminated", RugbyRugby.com, 26 February 2006
"Van Rooyen will get his day in the dock", RugbyRugby.com, 28 February 2006
"The big Van Rooyen bribe bombshell", RugbyRugby.com, 28 February 2006
"Spears to get shafted", RugbyRugby.com, 24 March 2006
"It is official: Spears shafted", RugbyRugby.com, 19 April 2006

External links
 SA Rugby Homepage

 
Rugby
Rugby union governing bodies in Africa
Sports organizations established in 1992
World Rugby members